The Statue of Johan Ludvig Runeberg is a statue dedicated to the Finland-Swedish author, national poet and priest Johan Ludvig Runeberg (1804–1877), designed and sculpted by his son Walter Runeberg (1838–1920). The statue is located in the Esplanadi park in Helsinki.

Sculpture 
Runeberg is depicted aged around of 55, dressed in a priest's coat. His right hand is on his chest, as if he would deliver a speech. 

By the foot of the pedestal there is a young woman wrapped in bearskin, symbolising Maiden of Finland. She is holding a laurel wreath and an inscription with the words of three verses of the Finnish national anthem in Runeberg's native language Swedish.

The memorial offers no evidence of the identity of the person it depicts, since it was considered to be self-evident at the time.

History 
A year after the poet's death, a committee with Zacharias Topelius as secretary commissioned a memorial from Walter Runeberg. The sculptor was working in Paris at the time. His draft was approved in 1882 and cast twice in bronze in Paris.

The statue of Runeberg was unveiled in front of 20 000 people on May 6, 1885, eight years after the poet's death. A second statue of Runeberg was unveiled on May 30 of the same year in his hometown Porvoo.

References 

Bronze sculptures in Finland
Statues in Finland
Statues and sculptures in Helsinki